Jay Leyda (February 12, 1910 – February 15, 1988) was an American avant-garde filmmaker and film historian, noted for his work on U.S, Soviet, and Chinese cinema, as well as his documentary compilations on the day-to-day lives of Herman Melville and Emily Dickinson.

Life and work
Leyda was born on February 12, 1910, in Detroit, Michigan. He was a member of the Workers Film and Photo League in the early 1930s. He traveled to the Soviet Union in 1933 to study film making at State Film Institute, Moscow, with Sergei Eisenstein, who had a troubled relationship with Stalin and the Soviet film bureaucracy. He participated in the filming of Eisenstein's lost film Bezhin Meadow (1935–37). When he returned to the United States in 1936 to become an assistant film curator at the Museum of Modern Art, he brought the only complete print of Eisenstein's Battleship Potemkin. In the 1940s he translated Eisenstein's writings.

Although he did not have a Ph.D., Leyda became fascinated with Herman Melville and became an important figure in the Melville revival. These scholars moved beyond the acceptance of Melville's first-person accounts in his works as reliably autobiographical. To provide concrete evidence, Leyda  searched libraries, family papers, local archives and newspapers across New England and New York to gather The Melville Log (1951) to document Melville's day to day activities and transactions.

Leyda’s wife, Si-Lan Chen, a ballet dancer of international reputation, was the daughter of Eugene Chen, a colleague of the Chinese revolutionary Sun Yat-sen. Leyda was invited in 1959 to work at the Film Archive of China in Beijing, where he stayed until 1964. His account of Chinese film history, Dianying, was the first full length treatment to appear in English. Although he could use the basic (and now outdated) Chinese scholarship only in summary translations, Leyda’s knowledge of film gave him still useful insights into individual films and techniques.

He was awarded the Eastman Kodak Gold Medal Award in 1984. He taught at Yale University (1969-1972), York University (1972–73) and New York University from 1973 until his death in New York on February 15, 1988, of heart failure. He was professor and dissertation advisor to noted film historian, Charles H. Harpole (creator of the ten volume History of American Cinema, dedicated to Leyda); leading film theorist, Tom Gunning; and scholar-practitioner Charles Musser. In 1981 he was a member of the jury at the 12th Moscow International Film Festival. He co-curated (with Charles Musser) Before Hollywood: Turn of the Century American Film (1987) for the American Federation of Arts, a six-part touring program of American films with an accompanying catalog, which the New York Times called "A fascinating look at the cinema that flourished between 1895 and 1915 in America, before movies could be mentioned in family newspapers."

Selected filmography
A Bronx Morning (1931) (11 minutes, black and white, silent), in the collection of the Museum of Modern Art.
People of the Cumberland (1937) (21 minutes, black and white, sound), co-directed by Sidney Meyers, also in the collection of the Museum of Modern Art. The film was a Frontier Film Group production. Also working on the film were Elia Kazan, Ralph Steiner, Erskine Caldwell, Alex North, Earl Robinson and Helen van Dongen.

Selected bibliography
 
 
 
 
 
 
 
 
 --- with Walter Aschaffenburg, Bartleby: Opera in a Prologue and Two Acts: Based on the Story by Herman Melville. (Bryn Mawr, Penn.: T. Presser,  1967).   ISBN
 —— , "Herman Melville, 1972," in 
 
 
  Includes Leyda's role in the "Melville Revival."
 Si-lan Chen Leyda, Footnote to History (New York: Dance Horizons), 1984

References

External links
 
 Jay Leyda Papers, 1925-1956,  at the UCLA Library;   Collection Guide at the Online Archive of California
 Jay and Si-lan Chen Leyda Papers 1913-1987, Tamiment Library/Robert F. Wagner Labor Archives, New York University Collection Guide

1910 births
1988 deaths
American film historians
American experimental filmmakers
20th-century American historians
20th-century American male writers
American male non-fiction writers
Herman Melville
Russian–English translators
American translators
Historians from Michigan
Filmmakers from Michigan
Writers from Detroit
20th-century translators
New York University faculty